Yitzhak Seiger (born 22 February 1936, died 5 February 1985) was an Israeli politician who served as a member of the Knesset for Likud between 1981 and his death in 1985.

Biography
Born in Haifa during the Mandate era, Seiger studied economics, political science and law at the Hebrew University of Jerusalem and was certified as a lawyer.

In 1969 he joined the Liberal Party. He went on to become chairman of the party's Economics Council and a member of its central committee and directorate, and was also a member of the executive committee of the Hitahdut HaIkarim.

In 1981 he was elected to the Knesset on the Likud list (then an alliance of the Liberal Party, Herut and other right-wing factions). He was re-elected in 1984, but died in office the following year. His seat was taken by Ya'akov Shamai.

References

External links

1936 births
1985 deaths
People from Haifa
Jews in Mandatory Palestine
Hebrew University of Jerusalem alumni
Liberal Party (Israel) politicians
Likud politicians
Members of the 10th Knesset (1981–1984)
Members of the 11th Knesset (1984–1988)